The 2021 Copa Bicentenario was a tournament with the participation of the 18 teams of the Liga 1, and 12 teams of the Liga 2. The champions will qualify for the 2022 Copa Sudamericana, as well as the Supercopa Peruana against the Liga 1 champions. Atlético Grau were the defending champions.

Sporting Cristal were the winners of the competition, beating Carlos A. Mannucci in the final by a 2–1 score to claim their first Copa Bicentenario title.

Teams

Stadia and locations

Because of the COVID-19 pandemic, the whole tournament is being played in seven stadiums:

First round

Final Rounds

Bracket

Round of 16

Quarterfinals

Semifinals

Final

Top goalscorers

See also
 2021 Liga 2
 2021 Copa Perú

Notes

References

External links
Official website 
Torneo Descentralizado news at Peru.com 
Torneo Descentralizado statistics and news at Dechalaca.com 

2021
2021 in Peruvian football